The Mariamman Temple was built in 1905 and is the oldest Hindu temple in Pretoria, South Africa, located in the suburb of Marabastad. The temple is dedicated to Mariamman, the goddess who followers of Hinduism believe controls smallpox and other infectious diseases.

References

External links
 

Religious buildings and structures completed in 1905
Mariamman temples
Hindu temples in South Africa
Religious buildings and structures in Pretoria
Religious buildings and structures in South Africa
1905 establishments in South Africa
South African heritage sites
Hindu temples
Hindu temples in Africa
20th-century religious buildings and structures in South Africa